Marihuana Reconsidered is a 1971 book by Lester Grinspoon about the effects of marijuana and its place in society, first published by Harvard University Press.

The book has received reviews from publications including Kirkus Reviews, JAMA, Clinical Pharmacology & Therapeutics, The New England Journal of Medicine, and The New York Times.

See also
 List of books about cannabis

References

Further reading 

 

1971 non-fiction books
Non-fiction books about cannabis
Harvard University Press books
American books about cannabis